Kismat  is a village of Nalbari district in Western Assam under 11 No Deharkuchi Gram Panchayat of Borigog Banbhag Development Block.

Language 
The primary language used in Kismat is Kamrupi, as in Nalbari district and Kamrup region

See also
 Villages of Nalbari District

References

External links
 

Villages in Nalbari district